July 9 - Eastern Orthodox Church calendar - July 11

All fixed commemorations below are celebrated on July 23 by Old Calendar.

For July 10th, Orthodox Churches on the Old Calendar commemorate the Saints listed on June 27.

Saints
 Holy 45 Martyrs at Nicopolis in Armenia (c. 319), including:
 Leontius, Maurice, Daniel, Anthony, Alexander, Anicetus, Sisinius, Meneus, Verelad, and Timothy.
 Martyr Apollonius of Sardis, Lydia, by crucifixion (3rd century)
 Martyr Tithoes.
 The Myriad (10,000) Venerable Fathers of the desert and caves of Nitria, martyred by the impious Patriarch Theophilus of Alexandria (c. 398)
 Martyrs Bianor and Silvanus (Silouan), of Pisidia (4th century)  
 Saint Athanasios the Pentaschoinitis, near Amathous, in Cyprus (7th century)

Pre-Schism Western saints
 Saint Alexander, an early martyr in Rome (c. 150)
 Holy Seven Brothers, early martyrs in Rome: Januarius, Felix, Philip, Sylvanus, Alexander, Vitalis, and Martial, under Antoninus Pius (c. 150)  (see also: January 25 - East )
 Saints Rufina and Secunda, two virgin-martyrs in Rome under Valerian, buried at Santa Rufina on the Aurelian Way (257)
 Saints Rufinus and Secundus, early martyrs buried on the Via Cornelia at the eleventh milestone from Rome.
 Saints Januarius, Marinus, Nabor and Felix, martyrs in North Africa.
 Saint Etto of Fescau (Hetto of Dompierre-sur-Helpe), Abbot of St Peter's at Fescau in Belgium and also bishop (c. 670)  
 Saint Pascharius (Pasquier), Bishop of Nantes in France, who founded the monastery of Aindre (c. 680)
 Saint Amalberga of Maubeuge, a Merovingian nun (690) 
 Saints Lantfrid, Waltram and Elilantus, three brothers who founded the Monastery of Benediktbeuren in Bavaria, Germany and succeeded one another as abbots (c. 770)
 Saint Amalberga of Temse, a nun at Munsterbilzen Abbey in Belgium (c. 772) 
 Saint Peter of Perugia (Peter Vincioli), founder of the monastery of San Pietro in Perugia (1007)

Post-Schism Orthodox saints
 Venerable Anthony of the Caves, Founder of Monasticism in Russia (1073)
 Saint Gregory, Bishop of Assos near Ephesus (1150)  (see also: 1st Sunday after November 10; March 4 )
 Venerable Silouan of the Far Caves in Kiev (13th-14th century)
 New Hieromartyr Archpriest Joseph of Damascus, and companions (1860)
 Saints Eumenius (1920) and Parthenius (1905), restorers of Koudouma Monastery on Crete.

New martyrs and confessors
 New Hieromartyrs Basil Pobedonostsev, Peter Zefirov and Stephen Lukanin, Priests (1918)
 New Hieromartyrs George Begma and Nestor Gudzovsky, Deacons (1918)

Other commemorations
 The Placing of the Precious Robe of the Lord at Moscow (1625)
 "Konevits" Icon of the Most Holy Theotokos.  
 Synaxis of the Saints of Vatopedi, Mount Athos.

Icon gallery

Notes

References

Sources
 July 10/July 23. Orthodox Calendar (PRAVOSLAVIE.RU).
 July 23 / July 10. HOLY TRINITY RUSSIAN ORTHODOX CHURCH (A parish of the Patriarchate of Moscow).
 July 10. OCA - The Lives of the Saints.
 July 10. The Year of Our Salvation - Holy Transfiguration Monastery, Brookline, Massachusetts. 
 The Autonomous Orthodox Metropolia of Western Europe and the Americas (ROCOR). St. Hilarion Calendar of Saints for the year of our Lord 2004. St. Hilarion Press (Austin, TX). p. 51.
 The Tenth Day of the Month of July. Orthodoxy in China.
 July 10. Latin Saints of the Orthodox Patriarchate of Rome.
 The Roman Martyrology. Transl. by the Archbishop of Baltimore. Last Edition, According to the Copy Printed at Rome in 1914. Revised Edition, with the Imprimatur of His Eminence Cardinal Gibbons. Baltimore: John Murphy Company, 1916. pp. 202–203.
 Rev. Richard Stanton. A Menology of England and Wales, or, Brief Memorials of the Ancient British and English Saints Arranged According to the Calendar, Together with the Martyrs of the 16th and 17th Centuries. London: Burns & Oates, 1892. p. 329.
Greek Sources
 Great Synaxaristes:  10 ΙΟΥΛΙΟΥ. ΜΕΓΑΣ ΣΥΝΑΞΑΡΙΣΤΗΣ.
  Συναξαριστής. 10 Ιουλίου. ECCLESIA.GR. (H ΕΚΚΛΗΣΙΑ ΤΗΣ ΕΛΛΑΔΟΣ). 
  ΙΟΥΛΙΟΣ. Αποστολική Διακονία της Εκκλησίας της Ελλάδος (Apostoliki Diakonia of the Church of Greece).
  10/07/2018. Ορθόδοξος Συναξαριστής. 
Russian Sources
  23 июля (10 июля). Православная Энциклопедия под редакцией Патриарха Московского и всея Руси Кирилла (электронная версия). (Orthodox Encyclopedia - Pravenc.ru).
  10 июля по старому стилю / 23 июля по новому стилю. СПЖ "Союз православных журналистов". 2018.
  10 июля (ст.ст.) 23 июля 2014 (нов. ст.). Русская Православная Церковь Отдел внешних церковных связей. (DECR).

July in the Eastern Orthodox calendar